The 1895 Penn Quakers football team was an American football team that represented the University of Pennsylvania as an independent during the 1895 college football season. In their fourth season under head coach George Washington Woodruff, the Quakers compiled a 14–0 record, shut out 10 of 14 opponents, and outscored all opponents by a total of 480 to 24. 

There was no contemporaneous system in 1895 for determining a national champion. However, Penn was retroactively named as the national champion by the Billingsley Report, Helms Athletic Foundation, Houlgate System, and National Championship Foundation, and as a co-national champion by Parke H. Davis.

Four Penn players were consensus first-team selections on the 1895 All-American football team: halfback George H. Brooke; center Alfred E. Bull; end Charlie Gelbert; and guard Charles Wharton.  Brooke, Gelbert, and Wharton were later inducted into the College Football Hall of Fame.

Schedule

References

Penn
Penn Quakers football seasons
College football national champions
College football undefeated seasons
Penn Quakers football